William Craven, 1st Earl of Craven may refer to:
William Craven, 1st Earl of Craven (1608–1697), 1st Baron Craven, created Earl in 1664
William Craven, 1st Earl of Craven (1770–1825), 7th Baron Craven, created Earl in 1801

See also
William Craven (disambiguation)